Stephen Dougray Scott (born 25 November 1965) is a Scottish actor. He has appeared in the films Ever After (1998), Mission: Impossible 2 (2000), Enigma (2001), Hitman (2007), and My Week with Marilyn (2011).

Early life
Scott was born 25 November 1965 in Glenrothes, Fife, Scotland, UK, the son of Elma, a nurse, and Alan Scott, a travelling salesman of refrigerators and freezers, and a former actor. He attended Auchmuty High School. 

Adopting his stage name from his grandmother's surname Dougray, he enrolled in a foundation course in drama before going on to attend the Royal Welsh College of Music & Drama in Cardiff from 1984 to 1987, where he received the Most Promising Drama Student Award. In 1988, he moved to London.

Career
Scott began his acting career in national theatre, television, and puppet shows. He appeared in his first role on the television series Soldier Soldier and made his film debut in Twin Town. His first major film roles were as Prince Henry in Ever After and the hero in the film adaptation of the Robert Harris novel Enigma. He played the villain in Mission: Impossible 2 (and was selected to do so by Tom Cruise). He was going to play Wolverine in the feature film version of X-Men. When Mission: Impossible 2 went over schedule and he was injured in a motorbike accident while shooting the chase scene, he was forced to drop out of the project and was replaced by Hugh Jackman in X-Men.

After the 2002 release of Die Another Day, Scott was a candidate to replace Pierce Brosnan as James Bond. Despite the numerous reports that Eon Productions was leaning towards naming Scott as the new Bond in the 007 adventure Casino Royale, the role eventually went to Daniel Craig. In January 2006, he appeared in the miniseries The Ten Commandments as Moses. He also appeared in the NBC series Heist, which aired in March 2006 for five episodes. From 2006 until 2007, he starred in the third season of Desperate Housewives as Teri Hatcher's character's new love interest. In 2007, he played the primary antagonist in the film Hitman, based on the Hitman video games. He appeared in the title role(s) of a modern re-telling of Dr Jekyll and Mr Hyde. In May 2009, it was announced that he was to play ex-con Michael O' Connor in the new RTÉ-ITV drama Father & Son.

Scott starred in The Day of the Triffids. The drama was broadcast in December 2009 as part of the BBC 1 Christmas schedule. In 2011, Scott featured in the film Love's Kitchen alongside his wife Claire Forlani. In April 2011, Scott portrayed football manager Matt Busby in the BBC TV drama United, which was centred on the Munich air disaster of 1958, in which Busby was badly injured but survived. In 2013, he guest starred as para-psychological researcher/ghost hunter Alec Palmer in the Doctor Who episode "Hide".

In 2014, Scott portrayed the main villain in Taken 3.

In March 2016, Scott became the voice of Orby in adverts for the oil and gas company BP.

In April 2016, Scott appeared in the second season of Fear the Walking Dead as Thomas Abigail, Victor Strand's business partner and lover.

In 2019, Scott joined the CW series Batwoman as Jacob Kane, the title character's father, set in the Arrowverse. He left the series during its second season.

Personal life
Scott is the father of twins, Eden and Gabriel Trevis Scott (b. 1998), with former wife Sarah Trevis. On 8 June 2007, he married actress Claire Forlani in Italy. They have a son Milo, born 27 December 2014. 

Scott is a fan of Hibernian Football Club, stemming from a great uncle being a scout for the team.

Allegations of abusive behaviour
On October 20, 2021, in an unsubstantiated social media site, Scott's former Batwoman costar Ruby Rose accused Scott of abusing women on the set of that series. In an Instagram story, Rose wrote, "Dougray hurt a female stunt double, he yelled like a little bitch at women and was a nightmare. He left when he wanted and arrived when he wanted. He abused women and in turn as a lead of a show I sent an email asking for a no yelling policy, they declined."

In a press statement, Scott denied Rose's allegations, calling them "defamatory and damaging" and "completely made up". He further alleged that Rose's exit from the series following the conclusion of the first season was "based on multiple complaints about her workplace behaviour".

Warner Bros., who produced the series, defended Scott in their own statement, saying, "Warner Bros. has found Mr Scott to be a consummate professional, and never received any allegation against him of bullying, or of abusive behaviour on his part. Mr Scott was greatly respected and admired by his colleagues, and was a leader on the set." They repeated Scott's claim that Rose had been let go because of complaints about her behaviour, and called her claims about Scott "revisionist history".

Filmography

Awards and nominations

References

External links
 

1965 births
Alumni of the Royal Welsh College of Music & Drama
Living people
People educated at Auchmuty High School
People from Glenrothes
Scottish expatriates in the United States
Scottish male film actors
Scottish male voice actors
Scottish male television actors
20th-century Scottish male actors
21st-century Scottish male actors
Scottish republicans
International Emmy Award for Best Actor winners